James, Jim, or Jimmy Peacock may refer to:

 James Peacock (navy officer) (died 1653), English naval officer.
 James Peacock (architect) (1735/1738–1814), English architect and surveyor.
 Jim Peacock (footballer) (1871–after 1896), English footballer.
 James Peacock (anthropologist) (born 1937), American anthropologist.
 Jim Peacock (born 1937), Australian molecular biologist.
James Peacock (rugby league)